Nativity! 2: Danger in the Manger is a 2012 British comedy film written and directed by Debbie Isitt, an improvised Christmas comedy and the second instalment in the Nativity film series. The film focuses on Donald Peterson, an anxious primary school teacher, who embarks on a wild and heartwarming adventure with his class and teaching assistant, the childlike Mr Poppy, as they travel to Wales to perform in a Christmas singing competition.

The film stars David Tennant playing the dual role of twin brothers, with Joanna Page as the wife of one of the brothers and Ian McNeice as the father of the brothers. Pam Ferris and Marc Wootton reprise their roles from the first film.

The film, which was the official Children in Need film of 2012, had its first public screening on 11 November 2012, when 42 Cineworld cinemas in the United Kingdom held one-off charity screenings with all proceeds going to Children in Need. The film's official premiere was at the Leicester Square Odeon on 14 November 2012. It went on a wide release on 23 November 2012.

Plot

Donald Peterson (David Tennant) is an anxious teacher who has just moved to a new house with his pregnant wife Sarah (Joanna Page). He accepts a teaching job at St. Bernadette's primary school, taking over the class formerly taught by Paul Maddens (Played by Martin Freeman in the first film), who by this point has left for the United States; in the interim, the enthusiastic and childlike teaching assistant Mr Desmond Poppy (Marc Wootton) has been letting the kids mess around with him and his childish tactics which causes every supply teacher the school's headmistress Mrs Bevan has found to leave.

The class wants to enter a competition called "A Song for Christmas", in which each school produces their own Christmas song, with the winning song earning its school £10,000 and the chance at being a Christmas number 1. However, headteacher Mrs Bevan (Pam Ferris) refuses the class permission to enter without a qualified teacher and worries that her nephew, Mr Poppy's, behaviour is so inappropriate that no teacher will ever stay in the job.

Donald lives in the shadow of his domineering father, and his estranged, 'golden boy' identical twin brother Roderick, who is a world-famous composer and conductor. When Mr Poppy decides St Bernadette's should enter the National 'Song for Christmas' competition, he persuades Donald to sign the entry forms, later kidnapping him for an impromptu road trip to Castell Llawen ("Merry Castle", not a real place) in Wales, where the competition is being held.

However, Roderick is also competing in the competition, mentoring the choir of posh St Cuthbert's College. Also Roderick is the main antagonist of this movie. Mr Shakespeare (Jason Watkins) from Oakmoor School, rivals of St Bernadette's, has also entered his class. Donald and Mr Poppy take their class through the wilds of Wales where they get past obstacles, such as exhaustion, rivers and baby nappies for a baby that one of the children smuggled into the group, to a mountain, which they have to climb over to reach Christmas Castle in time for the show.

As soon as they arrive Donald is reunited with Sarah and Mr Poppy with Mrs Bevan. However, Roderick is determined to win so he steals the baby and a part of Mr Shakespeare's song, locks his brother, Mr Poppy and the class in a giant snow globe and disqualifies them. But the vengeful Mr Shakespeare and his class help them out, Mrs. Bevan retrieves the baby and St. Bernadette's sing two successful songs while pretending to be Oakmoor. When Donald's father and brother come to find him backstage and end up belittling him once again, Donald brings up the courage to tell Roderick and his father to shut up after Donald slams Roderick about winning the prize, Him, Mr Poppy and the children having fun on the stage and that it might not be important to Roderick and his awards and reviews, followed by him shouting at Roderick and his father for their less-than-loving treatment of him, and stating that he is happy now that he has a family of his own, which leaves them both gobsmacked. Angel Matthews hears the commotion backstage and threatens to call security and have them ejected from the building, but Donald leaves the building of his own accord, his new family in tow, loudly declaring, "Good night; good luck; Merry Christmas; thank you very much!", Mr Poppy then goes back to ask Angel for an autograph until Donald calls him back and he kisses Roderick, saying "Cheer up, it's Christmas!" and Roderick, feeling severely disgusted, mutters "I'm gonna need a jab!".

As they leave, Sarah suddenly falls into labour and they place her on a donkey they found on the way to the castle and take shelter in a barn (which homages the actual birth of Jesus Christ) where Donald helps her give birth to twin boys. Mrs Bevan and the rest of St. Bernadette's join them, along with Donald and Rodrick's father who finally admits he is proud of Donald. Back at the castle, Oakmoor wins the 'Song for Christmas' though it should have been St. Bernadette's.

In the barn, Mr Shakespeare and Roderick show up. As Mr Poppy and the class sing another Christmas song for Donald, Sarah and their new babies, the two brothers finally reconcile and decide to get the family together more often, followed by Roderick placing his half of the locket given to him and Donald by their mother which makes Donald emotionally happy, Roderick then wishes him a Merry Christmas as the song finishes and Mr Poppy puts on a deep voice, making it sound like the donkey is saying "Merry Christmas", which gets everyone laughing.

Cast
 David Tennant as Donald Peterson / Roderick Peterson, estranged twin brothers
 Marc Wootton as Desmond Poppy, the primary school assistant and Mrs Bevan's nephew
 Jason Watkins as Mr Shakespeare, a teacher at rival school Oakmoor
 Joanna Page as Sarah Peterson, Donald's wife
 Ian McNeice as Mr Peterson Snr., Donald and Roderick's father
 Jessica Hynes as Angel Matthews, an opera singer and presenter of 'A Song For Christmas' 
 Pam Ferris as Mrs Bevan, the school headteacher and Desmond's aunt

Mr. Peterson's Class
Appeared in the first movie:
 Ben Wilby as Bob
 Brandon McDonald as Olly
 Caitlin Cronin as Lucy
 Dominic McKernan as Dan
 Ellie Coldicutt at Beth
 Faye Dolan as Jade
 Joe Lane as Edward
 Joshan Patel as Bill
 Maeve Dolan as Sam
 Michael McAuley as William
 Milly Webb as Neve
 Morgan Brennan as Charlotte
 Reece Stowe as Fraser
 Sydney Isitt-Ager as Sadie
 Tomas Ferris as Charlie

New children:
 Jesse Donohoe as Jesse 
 Pixie Davies as Pixie
 Joseph West as Joseph
 Kyle Johnson as Tommy
 Louise Blunt as Little Lucy
 Mason Daw as Mason 
 Mason Simpkins as Mason

Mr. Shakespeare's Class
 Adrianna Bertola as Adrianna
 Eleanor Grant as Eleanor 
 Ethan Smith as Ethan
 Freddie Watkins as Sebastian
 Grace Hollis as Grace
 Jessica Horton as Jessica
 Jessica Mogridge as Jessica
 Olivia Chu as Gracie
 Cerys Glover as Megan
 Samuel Waters as Sam
 Samuel Young as Samuel
 Scott Folan as Scott
 Shannon Maguire as Shannon

Release
Nativity 2: Danger in the Manger was theatrically released on 23 November 2012 by Entertainment One, and was released on DVD and Blu-ray on 18 November 2013 by Entertainment One.

When the film was released in the United Kingdom, it opened on #3, behind The Twilight Saga: Breaking Dawn – Part 2 and Skyfall.

Production
Nativity 2: Danger in the Manger! was filmed over the course of six weeks in October and November 2011, being filmed in England and Wales.

Prior to filming starting, writer/director Debbie Isitt and actor David Tennant spent a week in Coventry, spending time in real classrooms and with school choirs and plays, and helping with the auditions for the child roles. Filming began in Coventry on 15 October 2011 and filmed there for a fortnight.

On 29 October, the production moved to north Wales for another fortnight, filming in various rural locations, including at Llanrhaeadr-ym-Mochnant, Pistyll Rhaeadr and Lake Vyrnwy. The stable scenes were filmed at Avoncroft Museum in Bromsgrove, Worcestershire. The production then moved to its final location in Warwickshire, where they filmed at Warwick Castle (standing in for St. Cuthbert's College) and in Stratford-upon-Avon.

The film was originally going to be called Nativity 2: The Second Coming, as of January 2012 but the title was changed later the same year to Danger in the Manger!

The competition scenes were filmed in the Royal Shakespeare Company's Courtyard Theatre. Filming ended on 29 November 2011. The film was shot in the improvised style, with no proper script, and the actors not being told the narrative ahead of time, but having the plot revealed to them bit by bit as filming progressed.

Reception

Critical response
The film received generally negative reviews from critics. Robbie Collin from The Daily Telegraph rated the movie one star out of five claiming "this sequel pushes the amateurish angle much harder and seems to wear its abject lousiness as a badge of honour." Mark Kermode of BBC Radio 5 Live criticised the film's humour among the irresponsibility of the Mr Poppy character, suggesting the character "had enough of a CBeebies appeal but was more threatening and weird than funny and entertaining".

Sequel
A third film in the series began filming in November 2013, entitled: Nativity 3: Dude, Where's My Donkey?. It was released on 14 November 2014 and starred Martin Clunes.

See also 
 List of Christmas films

References

External links
 

2012 films
2012 independent films
British Christmas comedy films
Films shot in England
Films shot in Wales
British independent films
British sequel films
2010s Christmas comedy films
2012 comedy films
2010s English-language films
2010s British films